Thomas Neumann (born 1977) is a German computer scientist and full professor for Data Science and Engineering at the Technical University of Munich (TUM).

Education and career 
Thomas Neumann finished his studies in business informatics at the University of Mannheim in 2001 and received his doctor's degree in computer science under the supervision of Guido Moerkotte in 2005. He then worked as a senior researcher at the Max Planck Institute for Computer Science in Saarbrücken with Gerhard Weikum. During this time, Neumann developed RDF-3X, a system for graph databases. He habilitated in 2010 at Saarland University. In the same year, he joined the group for database systems at TUM under Alfons Kemper as associate professor. In 2017, he became a full professor for Data Science and Engineering, also at TUM.

Research 
His research areas are query optimisation and efficient query processing by just-in-time compilation.
As part of this research, he developed the main memory database system HyPer, which was sold to Tableau Software in 2016, and its successor system Umbra. He was awarded the Gottfried Wilhelm Leibniz Prize by the German Research Foundation for his work on HyPer.

Weblinks 

 Homepage of Thomas Neumann
 Publications indexed in the Digital Bibliography & Library Project (DBLP)
 HyPer: Hybrid OLTP&OLAP High-Performance Database System
 Umbra: A Disk-Based System with In-Memory Performance

Awards 
 2021 VLDB Test of Time Award
 2021 ICDE Ten-Year Influential Paper Award
 2020 Gottfried Wilhelm Leibniz Prize
 2016 ERC Consolidator Grant
 2014 Early Career Award of the VLDB Conference

References

German computer scientists
Academic staff of the Technical University of Munich
Gottfried Wilhelm Leibniz Prize winners
1977 births
Living people
Database researchers